is a 2010 Canadian drama film directed by Daniel Grou and written by Claude Lalonde. It premiered at the Festival du Nouveau Cinéma in Montreal. The story involves a ten-year-old boy called Tommy in the youth-protection system in Quebec.

Synopsis 
 follows several child psychiatrists, including Claude Legault's Gilles, as they attempt to break through the brittle exterior of a seriously ill-tempered young boy (Robert Naylor). The movie captures the unpleasant reality of life within a halfway house for juvenile delinquents.

Cast

Reception 
In a review for The Montreal Gazette, Brendan Kelly called the film "gripping" and praised the performances of Claude Legault ("so good as Gilles") and Robert Naylor ("a revelation"). He noted, however, that due to the nature of the story, the film was "not much fun to watch".

Accolades
The film won the 2010 Main Award of Mannheim-Heidelberg at the 59th International Filmfestival Mannheim-Heidelberg. At the 2010 International Film Festival Bratislava, the film won the FIPRESCI Jury Award and the Student Jury Award. For his role as Tommy, Robert Naylor won the award for Best Actor. Claude Legault won Prix Jutra for Best Actor.

References

External links
 

2010 films
2010 drama films
Canadian drama films
Films directed by Daniel Grou
2010s French-language films
French-language Canadian films
2010s Canadian films